The Communicative Relations Awards from PR Professionals, called The CRAPPs for short, is a UK-based award scheme created to celebrate the relationship between public relations professionals, journalists and bloggers. Founded by British public relations agency 10 Yetis in 2010, the awards are conducted entirely online.

Foundation 

The inaugural awards were launched in the UK in November, 2010. They were created by 10 Yetis PR Agency and sponsored by Daryl Willcox Publishing.

When speaking to a Guardian newspaper blogger Leigh commented that "The media calendar is already full of awards, but the difference here is recognising the often-difficult relationship between journalists and PRs whilst having a bit of fun at the same time."

The CRAPPs returned for its second year in November, 2011.

Selection 

Throughout the nomination process, members of the public relations industry were invited to nominate members of the British press for a variety of award categories.
A shortlist of ten individuals was then compiled in each category (excluding 'most approachable daily newspaper') based on the number of nominations. Users were invited to vote for one person in each category.

Reception

During the 2010 awards, The CRAPPs received numerous mentions in the media. The Guardian, The Daily Telegraph, Press Gazette, Communicate, PR Daily, Pocket-lint, PRMoment  and numerous other blogs and media featured the inaugural campaign.

Daily Telegraph city editor Jonathan Russell commented, "My favourite award is for the journalist most likely to tell a PR to sling his or her hook. There will be stiff competition".

Dominic Ponsford, editor of Press Gazette said "The PR industry is getting its own back on the journalistic community with the Communicative Relations Awards from PR Professionals." He continued, "Being nominated for any award by the PR industry has to be a mixed blessing for a journalist, and these ones certainly are".

Ben Smith, of industry news website PRMoment commented that the awards celebrate the "often-contentious ‘special relationship’ PRs and journalists share" and said that they provide "a reason for banter between the two camps".

The awards again received positive media attention in 2011, being featured by The Guardian, Press Gazette and PR industry websites PRmoment and Behind The Spin amongst others.

The CRAPPs winners

2010

2010 Award categories 

 The journalist that makes you feel warm and furry on the inside
 The 'most likely to tell you to sling your hook' award
 The 'best blogger' PR award
 Least twattish Twitterer — the must follow journo
 Most approachable daily newspaper
 Journalist you'd most like to bring to the dark side (employ as a PR)

The journalist that makes you feel warm and furry on the inside 

 Winner = Ben Moss – sport.co.uk
 2nd = Adrian Bridgwater — freelance
 3rd = Tara Evans – This Is Money

The 'most likely to tell you to sling your hook' award 

 Winner = Charles Arthur – The Guardian
 2nd = Sean Poulter – The Daily Mail
 3rd = Gary Flood — freelance

The 'best blogger' PR award 

 Winner = Tom Fordyce - BBC
 2nd = Sally Whittle – Who's the Mummy
 3rd = Adam Vincenzini – Comms Corner

Least twattish Twitterer — the must follow journo 

 Winner = Harry Wallop – The Daily Telegraph
 2nd = Caitlin Moran – The Times
 3rd = Dr Ben Goldacre – Bad Science

Most approachable daily newspaper 

 Winner = The Guardian
 2nd = The Daily Telegraph
 3rd = The Times

Journalist you'd most like to bring to the dark side (employ as a PR) 

 Winner = Mark Dye - freelance
 2nd = Harry Wallop – The Daily Telegraph
 3rd = Jemima Kiss – The Guardian

2011

2011 Award categories 

The CRAPPs returned in 2011 with more categories. A category entitled the 'most fanciable journalist (male/female)' award was included and then removed on the day the 2011 scheme launched. Leigh stated: 'The last thing we want to do is cause offence — our intention is to simply highlight the (at best) love/hate relationship between PR people and journalists in a light-hearted way.'

 The journalist that makes you feel warm and furry on the inside
 The 'most likely to tell you to sling your hook' award
 The 'best blogger' PR award
 Least twattish Twitterer — the must follow journo
 Least twattish Twitterer — the must follow PR
 Most approachable daily newspaper
 Journalist you'd most like to bring to the dark side (employ as a PR)

The journalist that makes you feel warm and furry on the inside 

 Winner = Olivia Solon - Wired UK
 2nd = Vicky Woollaston - Webuser
 3rd = Vikki Chowney – Econsultancy

The 'most likely to tell you to sling your hook' award 

 Winner = Charles Arthur - The Guardian
 2nd = Sean Poulter - The Daily Mail
 3rd = Alan Burkitt-Gray - Global Telecoms Business

The 'best blogger' PR award 

 Winner = Jon Silk – PRGeek.net
 2nd = Stephen Waddington – Wadds’ PR and Social Media blog
 3rd = Max Tatton-Brown – MaxTB.com

Least twattish Twitterer - the must follow journo 

 Winner = Olivia Solon – Wired UK - @olivia_solon
 2nd = Caitlin Moran – The Times - @caitlinmoran
 3rd = Fleet Street Fox – Unknown – @fleetstreetfox

Least twattish Twitterer - the must follow PR 

 Winner = Andrew Bloch – Frank PR - @andrewbloch
 2nd = Camilla Brown – Manifest Communications - @girlterate
 3rd = Beth Murray – Lansons - @bmbm

Most approachable daily newspaper 

 Winner = The Guardian
 2nd = The Daily Telegraph
 3rd = The Financial Times

Journalist you'd most like to bring to the dark side (employ as a PR) 

 Winner = Emma Barnett – The Daily Telegraph
 2nd = Harry Wallop – The Daily Telegraph
 3rd = Stuart Miles – Pocket-lint

References

External links 
 The CRAPPs homepage 
 10 Yetis PR Agency
 DWPub 

British awards
Awards established in 2010